Jenő Rácz (26  May 1907 – 26 January 1981) was a Hungarian politician who served as Minister of Finance between 1946 and 1947. He was a member of the Independent Smallholders' Party.

References
 Rulers.org

1907 births
1981 deaths
Finance ministers of Hungary
Independent Smallholders, Agrarian Workers and Civic Party politicians
20th-century Hungarian economists
20th-century Hungarian politicians